Giannis Gitsioudis (born 17 March 1962) is a former Greek footballer who played as a goalkeeper.

Career
Gitsioudis joined Iraklis Thessaloniki F.C. in July 1981, and played four seasons for the club in the Alpha Ethniki, before joining PAOK F.C. in July 1985. He played the next seven seasons for PAOK in the Alpha Ethniki.

Gitsioudis made five appearances for the Greece national football team from 1988 to 1989.

References

External links 

1962 births
Living people
Greek footballers
Greece international footballers
Iraklis Thessaloniki F.C. players
PAOK FC players
Association football goalkeepers